Tingena perichlora is a species of moth in the family Oecophoridae. It is endemic to New Zealand and has been observed in the southern parts of the South Island. This species appears to inhabit manuka scrub. Adults of this species are on the wing from October to January.

Taxonomy 
This species was first described by Edward Meyrick in 1907 using specimens collected by Alfred Philpott in Invercargill in November and December and named Borkhausenia perichlora. In 1915 Meyrick discussed this species under that name. In 1926 Alfred Philpott discussed and illustrated the genitalia of the male of this species and stated that he could not detect any difference in the genitalia between this species and T. chloradelpha. Philpott went on to hypothesise that the two species may possibly be the northern and southern varieties of the same species as they only show difference in colour characteristics. In 1928 George Hudson discussed and illustrated this species in his book The butterflies and moths of New Zealand. In 1988 J. S. Dugdale placed this species within the genus Tingena. The male lectotype is held at the Natural History Museum, London.

Description

Meyrick described this species as follows:
Hudson stated that this species has considerable variations in its markings with some specimens having less developing patterns.

Distribution 
This species is endemic to New Zealand and has been observed in southern parts of the South Island including Invercargill, Dunedin and the Hunter Mountains.

Behaviour 
The adults of this species are on the wing from October to January.

Habitat 
This species has shown a preference for manuka scrub habitat.

References

Oecophoridae
Moths of New Zealand
Moths described in 1907
Endemic fauna of New Zealand
Taxa named by Edward Meyrick
Endemic moths of New Zealand